Guangdong Prison Administrative Bureau is the correctional agency of Guangdong Province, China. It is headquartered in Baiyun District, Guangzhou. As of September 2014 Liu Fang is the head of the bureau.

As of 2015 the province has 127 prisons and detention houses.

History
From the beginning of 2014 until 2015 there were a series of incidents involving illegal sentence commutations and escapes from the Guangdong prison system.

The prison in Jieyang created an online inmate information system in April 2014; this is the first such program in Mainland China. In September 2014 the bureau announced that it was going to begin publishing inmate information online by the end of 2014.

Prisons

Guangdong province has over 24 prisons.
 Dongguan Prison
 Guangdong Women's Prison
 Jieyang Prison
 Panyu Prison
 Shaoguan Prison

See also
 List of prisons in Guangdong

References

External links
 Guangdong Prison Administrative Bureau /

Provincial-level prison administrative bureaux in China
Politics of Guangdong